The Nickel Plate Trail is a rail trail that encompasses  of abandoned railroad corridor in north central Indiana. The trail runs from Rochester to Kokomo.

Route 
The northern endpoint of the trail starts is in Rochester in Fulton and travels south into Miami through Macy, Deedsville, Denver to the north of Peru. The trail then uses various roadway combinations and picks back up as a separate trail on the west side of the city. From Peru, the trail heads south through Bunker Hill and Miami in Miami County and through Cassville in Howard County, Indiana.

Plans 
Currently, the trail ends in Howard County, just north of the city of Kokomo. In 2018 the Industrial Heritage Trail in Kokomo was extended via a lighted pedestrian bridge over IN 931 and under US 31 effectively extending the trail just south of Lincoln Road near State Road 931.

Other communities south of Kokomo have expressed interest in connecting to the Nickel Plate Trail. Recently, Tipton started work on a comprehensive plan with hopes of connecting to the Nickel Plate Trail. Should the Nickel Plate Trail connect to Tipton, the trail would then be near 60 miles in length, meeting the same length of the Cardinal Greenway, the current longest rail trail in Indiana. It would also connect Tipton, Sharpsville, Oakford to Kokomo via an extension of the current Industrial Heritage Trail on the city's south side.

In Hamilton County, the tracks from Atlanta, Indiana to Noblesville are used by the Nickel Plate Express heritage railway.  From Noblesville to Indianapolis, construction has started to convert the right of way into another part of the Nickel Plate Trail.

See also
 American Discovery Trail 
 Cardinal Greenway 
 List of cycleways in Indiana

References 

Rail trails in Indiana